Computer Shopper was a monthly consumer computer magazine published by SX2 Media Labs. The magazine ceased print publication in April 2009. The website was closed and redirected to the PCMag website in late May 2018.

History 
Computer Shopper magazine was established in 1979 in Titusville, Florida. It began as a tabloid-size publication on yellow newsprint that primarily contained classified advertising and ads for kit computers, parts, and software. The magazine was created by Glenn Patch, publisher of the photo-equipment magazine Shutterbug Ads, in the hopes of applying its formula to a PC-technology magazine.  The magazine expanded into prebuilt home computers and white box IBM PC compatibles through the 1980s.

The magazine grew to several hundred pages, mostly of advertisements. It was during this time that the magazine was sold to Ziff Davis Publishing, first as a limited partnership, then solely owned. It was later sold, in 2000, along with Ziff-Davis' ZDNet Web site, to CNET. CNET sold Computer Shopper to new owners, SX2 Media Labs, in 2006. In April 2009, SX2 Media Labs discontinued the print version of the magazine. The business continued on as a Web entity, ComputerShopper.com, which was reacquired by Ziff-Davis in 2012.

Magazine 
Computer Shopper, the print magazine, comprised the following sections at the end of its publication:
 Boot Up. A commentary and product-news section written by the magazine's expert editors. A column written by Senior Editor Sarah E. Anderson examined tech-buying and related issues from a working mother's perspective.
 Reviews. Each issue contained more than two dozen reviews.
 Features. Typically two or three per issue, the feature stories were often product-centric, comprising product comparisons and buying guides.
 Help and How-To. These articles provided assistance for technical problems and gave step-by-step directions on how to perform common tasks.
 Shut Down. A retrospective look at technology through the archives of Computer Shopper.
 A user-submitted listing of Bulletin Board Systems (BBS) throughout the US and Canada.

List of editors-in-chief 
 Stan Veit (1983–1989)
 Bob Lindstrom (1989–1991)
 John Dickinson (1991–1994)
 John Blackford (1994–2000)
 Janice Chen (2000–2006)
 Rik Fairlie (2006–2007)
 John A. Burek (2008–2017)

References 

Defunct computer magazines published in the United States
Home computer magazines
Monthly magazines published in the United States
Magazines established in 1979
Magazines disestablished in 2009
Magazines published in Florida
1979 establishments in Florida
2009 disestablishments in Florida